The Chemical Department  and later known as the Central Dockyard Laboratory  was the Admiralty department that was responsible for the testing and trials of lubricants, metals and paints for the Royal Navy it was based at Portsmouth, England from 1870 to 1977.

History
The Admiralty Chemical Department, Portsmouth, originated in the appointment of an Admiralty Chemist in 1867.  In 1870 as the work of the ADMC was expanding led to the creation of a department with supporting researchers and clerical staff being established. In 1956 specific functions of the Central Metallurgical Laboratory transferred to the department when it was re-styled as the Central Dockyard Laboratory. In 1977 it merged with Admiralty Marine Technology Establishment but remained a sub-division of that organisation. It provided Support Services for fleet and shore establishments, including metallurgy, chemistry, biology, paint technology and reactor chemistry research.

Admiralty Chemists
Post holders included:
 Dr William John Hay, Esq., F.C.S, 1867-1874 
 Dr William Weston, Esq., F.C.S, 1874-1904 
 Dr Arnold Philip, Esq., F.C.S, 1904-1926 
 Dr Frank George Edmed Esq. FIC. 1926-1940 
This is an incomplete list of office holders.

Timeline
 Board of Admiralty, Office of the Admiralty Chemist, (1872-1870)
 Board of Admiralty, Chemical Department, (1870-1965)
 Board of Admiralty, Central Dockyard Laboratory, (1965-1977)
 Ministry of Defence, Admiralty Marine Technology Establishment (AMTE), (1977-1984)
 Ministry of Defence, Admiralty Research Establishment (ARE), (1984-1991)
 Ministry of Defence,  Defence Research Agency, (1991-1995)

See also
Admiralty Central Metallurgical Laboratory

References

External links

Admiralty departments
Admiralty during World War I
Admiralty during World War II
Ministry of Defence Navy Department
1870 establishments in the United Kingdom
1977 disestablishments in the United Kingdom